Empire Genomics is a cancer molecular diagnostics company. They make genetic tests for over 200 different types of health concerns. It is based in Buffalo, New York in the United States.

Dr. Norma J. Nowak founded Empire Genomics in 2006 in Buffalo, New York. It developed out of a project at Roswell Park Comprehensive Cancer Center. Their headquarters is located in Buffalo at the Buffalo Niagara Medical Campus.

The company develops non-invasive tests that focus around health concerns such as cancer, autism and Down syndrome.
In 2012, Empire Genomics released a test for multiple myeloma and opened a new laboratory to focus on the test. As of 2012, Anthony Johnson is chief executive officer. That same year, the company received a $400,000 grant from the Empire State Development Corporation.

On February 19, 2019, the company announced the appointments of Andy Watson as CEO and Anthony Scarpello to CCO, and the opening of its new headquarters in Williamsville, NY.

In November 2022, it was announced Empire Genomics had been acquired by the Pacheco-headquartered provider of automated immunohistochemistry (IHC) and fluorescent in situ hybridization (FISH) instrumentation and reagents, Biocare Medical.

References

External links

Official website

Companies based in Buffalo, New York
Companies established in 2006
Biotechnology companies of the United States